Throughout Dolly Parton's career there have over 200 compilation albums released of her material. These compilations albums have been released on a variety of labels since the start of Parton's career, beginning with her first appearance on an LP record in 1963 to multi-disc, career-spanning box sets.

Compilation albums

1960s–1970s

1980s

1990s

2000s

2010s–2020s

References

Dolly Parton compilation albums
Country music discographies
Discographies of American artists